Sanatruk (Latinized as Sanatruces) was a member of the Arsacid dynasty of Armenia who succeeded Tiridates I of Armenia as King of Armenia at the end of the 1st century. He was also King of Osroene (reigned 91–109), a historic kingdom located in Mesopotamia. Little or no information is available from either literary or numismatic sources regarding the successor of Tiridates. Through the collation of various Classical and Armenian sources, Sanatruk is assumed to have reigned around the start of the 2nd century. Certain scholars proposed that Sanatruk succeeded Tiridates between 75 and 110 but this hypothesis for which there is no explicit evidence has been rejected by others. His merits are praised by Arrian in his Parthica where he is equated with the most illustrious Greeks and Romans. Hagiographic tradition blames him for the martyrdom of the Apostle St. Thaddeus in Armenia, as well as his own daughter, St. Sandukht the Virgin. In 110 the throne of Armenia was held by Axidares, the son of the Parthian monarch of Atropatene, Pacorus II of Parthia who was deposed in 113 by Trajan. A number of sources have named Sanatruk as one of the leaders of the revolt against Trajan's occupation by 117.

Moses of Chorene writes that Sanatruk, while being a child was taken by a sister of King Abgar of Edessa - Avde from Edessa to Armenia through the Kordvats Mountains, where they were caught in a sudden snow storm. They spent three days battling the storm and the child survived thanks to a white coated animal that kept him warm. It is thought that the animal must have been a white dog based on the etymology of the name Sanatruk that was soon after bestowed on the child (San - accusative form of Armenian Շուն (shun: dog) and truk (truk: tribute/gift ultimately from Armenian tur: give). A literal English translation of Sanatruk would be "dog's gift".

See also

 Osroene

Bibliography

Notes

1st-century kings of Armenia
2nd-century kings of Armenia
1st-century births
2nd-century deaths
Kings of Osroene
Arsacid kings of Armenia